Skyservice or sky service may refer to:

 Skyservice Airlines, a defunct chartered airline based in Toronto
 Skyservice Investments, Canadian operator and provider of business aviation services
 Skyservice Business Aviation, FBO and business jet operator headquartered in Toronto, with bases in Montreal, Calgary and Ottawa
 Skyservice Air Ambulance, Air Ambulance operator headquartered in Montreal, with a base in Toronto
 Skyservice USA
 Sky Service (Belgium), a defunct Belgian airline
 Sky Service (Kazakhstan), chartered airline
 Sky Service Aviation, a defunct charter airline based in Madrid, Spain